The 2014–15 UIC Flames men's basketball team represented the University of Illinois at Chicago in the 2014–15 NCAA Division I men's basketball season. Their head coach was Howard Moore, serving his fifth year. The Flames played their home games at the UIC Pavilion and were members of the Horizon League. They finished the season 10–24, 4–12 in Horizon League play to finish in seventh place. They defeated Wright State and Oakland to advance to the semifinals of the Horizon League tournament where they lost to Green Bay.

On March 10, head coach Howard Moore was fired. He finished at UIC with a five year record of 49–111.

Roster

Schedule

|-
! colspan="9" style="background:#036; color:#c03;"| Exhibition

|-
! colspan="9" style="background:#036; color:#c03;"|  Regular season

|-
! colspan="9" style="background:#036; color:#c03;"|Horizon League tournament

References

UIC Flames
UIC Flames men's basketball seasons
2014 in sports in Illinois
2015 in sports in Illinois